Turning Point: Fall of Liberty is a first-person shooter video game, developed by Spark Unlimited and published by Codemasters for the PlayStation 3, Xbox 360 and Microsoft Windows. It was released in 2008 in North America on February 26, in Europe on March 14; and in Australia on March 21.

The game takes place in an alternate history in which Winston Churchill dies in 1931, eight years before the start of World War II, presenting the possibility of what could have happened to Europe, the United States, and the rest of the world without his leadership; the United Kingdom is subdued by Nazi Germany in 1940, and the rest of Europe, North Africa and the Middle East fall soon afterward. The United States, infected with anti-war sentiment, does not get involved overseas. The game takes place in the midst of the Greater German Reich's invasion and occupation of the East Coast of the United States in 1953.

Gameplay
In Turning Point: Fall of Liberty, the player assumes the role of Dan Carson, an average New York construction worker who has no prior connection to the military. Unlike other similar war games, the player's objective is not to help the Allies win the war, but merely to survive in an environment of total war as a resistance fighter against Nazi Germany.

The game includes many advanced versions of weapons used in World War II, and several that were being researched and developed late in the war but never made it to mass production. Super-heavy tanks such as the E-100 and Landkreuzer P. 1000 Ratte appear in the game, as well as the Nachteule troop-transport zeppelin, the Flugzeugträger German aircraft carrier Graf Zeppelin, and various advanced jet fighters and bombers, all of which are utilized by the German invasion force.

The player can wield up to two weapons, which can be German or American. Weapons range from submachine guns to rifles to rocket launchers. He can also wield up to four grenades. When the player gets close to a Nazi soldier, a prompt comes up. Pressing the melee button when the prompt is seen allows two options to be taken. One is an instant kill, where Carson melees the Nazi soldier to death. The other is the human shield, where Carson knocks the Nazi soldier out, holds him in a stranglehold, and takes his sidearm. He can walk around killing other Nazi soldiers with the human shield protecting him against most damage until his human shield dies. Occasionally, a Nazi soldier will be standing near an interactive object, such as a furnace or a toilet, allowing Carson to perform an environmental kill with it.

Multiplayer
Multiplayer in Turning Point: Fall of Liberty was available online via Xbox Live, PlayStation Network or through a System Link although there are currently no servers available for Xbox Live. Gameplay is divided into two modes: deathmatch and team deathmatch with players able to play as Nazi soldiers or as the American Resistance. The players can pick their primary weapon (a pistol serves as the secondary weapon). Gameplay is centered on four maps based on locations within the game and each map also has its own player limit with eight as the maximum.

Campaign

Background
Turning Point: Fall of Liberty is based on an alternate history by Stephen R. Pastore where the point of divergence occurs with Winston Churchill's death in 1931 from being hit by a cab while visiting New York City, instead of surviving. Nine years later, without his foresight and leadership, the United Kingdom falls to the Third Reich in 1940 after the British Royal Air Force was defeated by the German Luftwaffe, achieving air supremacy, and Operation Sea Lion was launched, forcing Prime Minister Neville Chamberlain to surrender to Nazi Germany. This allows Germany to sweep through the other surrounding countries virtually unopposed. The Third Reich invades the Soviet Union with Operation Barbarossa unhampered, and conquers large amounts of territory and many Russian cities, including Stalingrad, Leningrad, and Moscow. After numerous German victories decimate the disorganized Russians, the Red Army and Joseph Stalin surrender to the Wehrmacht and Adolf Hitler. The non-aggression pact Stalin made with Germany prior to the invasion left him without any allies to back him up. The Nazis also help their Italian allies conquer North Africa, creating Benito Mussolini's "New Roman Empire". Japan sweeps through Eastern Asia unopposed using Germany's captured Middle Eastern and Soviet oil, which makes any U.S. oil embargo against Japan useless. Various resistance groups form in occupied Europe against the oppressive regime. They are unable to do much against the Nazis, and many are crushed. Even peaceful demonstrations against Nazi occupation are met with fierce hostility. During the war, the United States chose an isolationist policy, implemented by Republican president Thomas E. Dewey (who defeated Harry S. Truman in the 1948 United States presidential election).

A period of development follows the success of the Axis Powers, transforming conquered Europe, Asia and Africa into the Greater German Reich and allowing allies Japan and Italy to share in the prosperity; at the same time, the Nazis start engineering and mass-producing many of their Wunderwaffen, including jet fighters, super-heavy tanks, and high-tech bombers. This advanced technology makes Germany the strongest nation on the planet. With the war essentially over, the people of the world wonder why the weapons are being developed, and what is the purpose of the build-up. This causes rising tensions between the now technologically superior German Reich and the United States, one of the few nations that is still free from Nazi rule. The United States and the rest of the League of Nations continue to condemn the actions of Nazi Germany in the occupied territories, but make no attempts to stop them, as the U.S. is still dominated by anti-war sentiment.

When secret plans for an American invasion by German and Japanese forces are found by the British Resistance, codenamed Operation Humpback Whale, Germany and Japan are quick to deny it, saying these accusations are ludicrous. President Dewey believes their lies, and continues his isolationist policies, refusing to stock up on arms and increase the size of the military in case of a possible invasion. The invasion plans turn out to be true, however, and Operation Humpback Whale is launched in 1953, with a combined German/Japanese offensive striking at the United States on both the Atlantic and Pacific coasts.

New York City

The game begins with German aircraft attacking New York City. The protagonist, Dan Carson, is a construction worker who is on an unfinished skyscraper when the surprise attack hits. Surviving the attack, Carson manages to link up with a National Guard unit battling a fighting retreat out of the city. The German invasion force overruns major cities on the Eastern Seaboard including New York, Boston, Philadelphia, and Washington, D.C. Propaganda Minister Joseph Goebbels announces that President Thomas E. Dewey, and Vice President Haley will be resigning, allowing the Nazi-supported Speaker of the House James Edward Stevenson to lead the new puppet government. President Stevenson's first act in office is calling all American armed forces to stand down.

Washington, D.C.
Following America's surrender, a General named George Donnelly, in defiance of President Stevenson's orders, leads a raid against the Nazi controlled Federal Courthouse, where  Minister Goebbels was stationed. Donnelly is captured, and faces charges of treason and possible execution. Carson, now a member of the American Resistance in Washington, D.C., meets up with other Resistance members, and they agree to rescue Donnelly. Carson makes it to the prison where Donnelly is held and saves him, and the two fight their way out of the prison. The Resistance finally decides to assassinate President Stevenson, and launches a full assault against the heavily fortified White House. Carson goes inside alone, killing dozens of Nazi soldiers, before allowing the demolitions team into the White House to plant the bombs. Carson finds Stevenson in the middle of an address to the nation, and kills him. The Resistance then blows up the building. During the attack, the Resistance also discovered secret documents detailing the existence of a secret lab that developed the atomic bomb under the Tower of London. The plans also reveal the major American city it was supposed to be tested on is New York City. The Resistance manages to secure a small plane and airdrop Carson over London, launching another attack on the Houses of Parliament to serve as a distraction, in order to put an end to the threat.

London
Landing on the White Tower, Carson takes out the snipers guarding the outside of the Tower, and makes his way inside. Carson destroys two heavily guarded atomic bombs, but a British scientist informs him that the last bomb has been moved onto an extremely large Zeppelin bound for New York City. The Zeppelin is docked over the Tower Bridge for last-minute repairs, where the Resistance sees the atomic bomb being loaded onto it. Carson sneaks on board the Zeppelin. Running out of time, he kills the last squad of Nazi soldiers trying to halt his tampering with the atomic bomb, but the bomb's controls are damaged in the firefight, leaving Carson unable to simply jettison the bomb. With time almost run out, Carson rewires the atomic bomb to self-destruct. The atomic bomb explodes, destroying the Zeppelin, killing all of the Nazi troops in and near it, as well as Carson himself; however, this sacrifice saves New York City. This last act of sacrifice will inspire millions of other Americans to join the American Resistance to fight the Nazi oppressors and restore democracy throughout the world.

Marketing

Demo
A basic demo was released on the Xbox Live Marketplace on January 25, 2008, but no demo was released on the PlayStation Store. The demo showcased the initial level of the game and also demonstrated some gameplay features such as grappling and using enemies as human shields. The demo received negative feedback from gaming websites who criticized several disappointing aspects of the gameplay such as viewing sensitivity, problems with the AI, and graphics issues. The game's developers at Spark stated that the game should not be judged by the demo, and that they have corrected several of the issues many people had with it.

Collector's Edition and exclusives
A Collector's Edition of Turning Point: Fall of Liberty was made available for the Xbox 360 only. This edition includes a soundtrack and concept art book for the game. Those who reserved any version of the game before its release  received a "Join the Resistance" pre-order gift pack containing a behind-the-scenes DVD, postcards featuring scenes from the game, and a timeline poster detailing the events leading up to the story. Video game retailer GameStop also offered two exclusive items with a reservation of the game: an 8" by 11" lithograph print depicting the assault on New York City and a game code to unlock infinite ammo during gameplay.

Reception

Turning Point: Fall of Liberty received "generally unfavorable reviews" on all platforms according to the review aggregation website Metacritic. IGN noted the unique concept for the game's plot, but criticized the quality of the gaming experience as "archaic". Other criticisms included a flat, linear storyline that provided little characterization, a lackluster and unamusing multiplayer mode, and frustratingly uncooperative gameplay actions such as climbing ladders. The musical score was better received, being described as a solid and well-made part of the game. Overall, the game was considered a "shining example of a great idea poorly executed".

1UP.com gave the Xbox 360 version a slightly higher rating, but identified the game's worst shortcoming as allowing "the potential narrative (to take) a backseat for most of the adventure". While most criticism was aimed at the underdevelopment of the plot, the review also commented on problems with repetitive objectives and control inconsistencies. In the conclusion, the review stated that "every time Turning Point does something well, it falls short somewhere else". On a more positive note, the game was called "a more than competent deviation for someone itching to kill more Nazis", mainly due to the intriguing story.

In response to the poor reception of the game by reviewers, the developers of Turning Point: Fall of Liberty have said that their game was not intended for hardcore gamers, but rather a more casual audience. They claim that reviewers are "too hard" on casual games, explaining the low scores that several games, including Turning Point, have received over the weeks following its release.

See also
Alternate history
Counterfactual history
What If? (essays)
Edward F. Cantasano
Hypothetical Axis victory in World War II

References

External links
 

2008 video games
Codemasters games
Games for Windows certified games
Video games about Nazi Germany
PlayStation 3 games
Unreal Engine games
Video games scored by Michael Giacchino
Video games developed in the United States
Video games set in New York City
Video games set in Washington, D.C.
Video games set in London
Windows games
Xbox 360 games
Multiplayer and single-player video games
Dieselpunk
Video games about World War II alternate histories
Video games set in 1953